José Sánchez Rosa (1864–1936) was an Andalusian anarchist.

Early life and career 

José Sánchez Rosa was born in Grazalema (Andalusian Spain) in 1864. Imprisoned during the 1892 Mano Negra affair, he received a pardon in 1900. As a regional anarchist propagandist, he published El abogado del obrero, La aritmética del obrero, and La idea anarquista. He contributed to Revista Blanca and edited El Productor and La Anarquía. He was assassinated by Spanish Nationalists in Seville, 1936.

References

Further reading 

 

1864 births
1936 deaths
Spanish anarchists
People from Andalusia
20th-century Spanish educators
Recipients of Spanish royal pardons
Spanish casualties of the Spanish Civil War